The Big Ten Conference first sponsored football in 1896. This is an era-list of its annual standings from 1896 to 1958.

Standings

Western Conference era (1896–1916)

Big Ten era (1917–present)

References

Big Ten Conference
Standings